Sambal-Lei Sekpil is the world's tallest topiary. Created by Moirangthem Okendra Kumbi, it is modelled in the shape of a series of open umbrellas and spheres.

Okendra started mending the Sambal-Lei in 1983, originally planted by his sister in a small mustard oil can.  Sambal-Lei is a flowering shrub use for fencing gardens in Manipur - Sambal means fencing and Lei means flower in Meitei language. Sekpil indicates the shape of the topiary and is derived from an ancient Meitei word for a decorative bamboo post with rounded structured cloths forming canopy in many stages. The sekpil, at present also called as "Shattra" is generally used in worship and festivals in Manipur.

Facts at a glance
 Botanical name: Duranta repens L.
 Cultivar: 'Variegata'.
 Common name: Sky Flower.
 Hindi name: Nilkanta.
 Meitei name: Sambal-lei Mana Arangba.
 Planting year: 1981.
 Experiment started year: 1983.
 National record (Limca Book of Records): 18 November 1992 (at the height of 6 m (20 ft), with 11 steps).
 World record (Guinness Book of Records): 26 November 1999 (at the height of 15 m (50 ft), with 35 steps).
 Present height: 40 ft., as of March 2014.
 Topiary steps: 44.

References

 World's tallest topiary at Guinness Book of Records
 Sambal-Lei Sekpil the tallest Topiary in the World at imphalwest.nic.ic

Landscape architecture
Tourist attractions in Manipur